The Women's Field Hockey Qualifier for the 2011 Pan American Games was a field hockey series between Cuba and Jamaica to determine the last entry into the field hockey competition at the 2011 Pan American Games for women. All games were played in Mona Hockey Field, Kingston, Jamaica from October 28–31, 2010.

Cuba won the series 3–0 and as a result advanced to the 2011 Pan American Games.

This series became necessary, because Cuba decided to skip the 2010 Central American and Caribbean Games. Jamaica would have qualified under the old qualifying system (third qualifying position from the 2009 Pan American Cup).

Results

Pool A

References

Women's Qualifier
Qualification tournaments for the 2011 Pan American Games
October 2010 sports events in North America
2011 Pan American Games Qualifier
2010 in Jamaican sport
Sport in Kingston, Jamaica